National Highway 81 (NH 81) is a National Highway in Eastern Indian states of Bihar and West Bengal. NH 81 links Kora in Bihar to Malda in West Bengal.

See also 
 National Highway
 List of National Highways
 National Highways Development Project

References 

81
81
National highways in India (old numbering)